In mathematics, a divergent series is an infinite series that is not convergent, meaning that the infinite sequence of the partial sums of the series does not have a finite limit.

If a series converges, the individual terms of the series must approach zero. Thus any series in which the individual terms do not approach zero diverges. However, convergence is a stronger condition: not all series whose terms approach zero converge. A counterexample is the harmonic series

The divergence of the harmonic series was proven by the medieval mathematician Nicole Oresme.

In specialized mathematical contexts, values can be objectively assigned to certain series whose sequences of partial sums diverge, in order to make meaning of the divergence of the series. A summability method or summation method is a partial function from the set of series to values. For example, Cesàro summation assigns Grandi's divergent series

the value . Cesàro summation is an averaging method, in that it relies on the arithmetic mean of the sequence of partial sums. Other methods involve analytic continuations of related series. In physics, there are a wide variety of summability methods; these are discussed in greater detail in the article on regularization.

History

Before the 19th century, divergent series were widely used by Leonhard Euler and others, but often led to confusing and contradictory results. A major problem was Euler's idea that any divergent series should have a natural sum, without first defining what is meant by the sum of a divergent series. Augustin-Louis Cauchy eventually gave a rigorous definition of the sum of a (convergent) series, and for some time after this, divergent series were mostly excluded from mathematics. They reappeared in 1886 with Henri Poincaré's work on asymptotic series. In 1890, Ernesto Cesàro realized that one could give a rigorous definition of the sum of some divergent series, and defined Cesàro summation. (This was not the first use of Cesàro summation, which was used implicitly by Ferdinand Georg Frobenius in 1880; Cesàro's key contribution was not the discovery of this method, but his idea that one should give an explicit definition of the sum of a divergent series.) In the years after Cesàro's paper, several other mathematicians gave other definitions of the sum of a divergent series, although these are not always compatible: different definitions can give different answers for the sum of the same divergent series; so, when talking about the sum of a divergent series, it is necessary to specify which summation method one is using.

Examples

 1 - 1 + 1 - 1 + ⋯
 1 − 2 + 3 − 4 + ⋯
 1 − 1 + 2 − 6 + 24 − 120 + ⋯
 1 − 2 + 4 − 8 + ⋯
 1 + 2 + 4 + 8 + ⋯
 1 + 1 + 1 + 1 + ⋯
 1 + 2 + 3 + 4 + ⋯

Theorems on methods for summing divergent series
A summability method M is regular if it agrees with the actual limit on all convergent series. Such a result is called an Abelian theorem for M, from the prototypical Abel's theorem. More subtle, are partial converse results, called Tauberian theorems, from a prototype proved by Alfred Tauber. Here partial converse means that if M sums the series Σ, and some side-condition holds, then Σ was convergent in the first place; without any side-condition such a result would say that M only summed convergent series (making it useless as a summation method for divergent series).

The function giving the sum of a convergent series is linear, and it follows from the Hahn–Banach theorem that it may be extended to a summation method summing any series with bounded partial sums. This is called the Banach limit. This fact is not very useful in practice, since there are many such extensions, inconsistent with each other, and also since proving such operators exist requires invoking the axiom of choice or its equivalents, such as Zorn's lemma. They are therefore nonconstructive.

The subject of divergent series, as a domain of mathematical analysis, is primarily concerned with explicit and natural techniques such as Abel summation, Cesàro summation and Borel summation, and their relationships. The advent of Wiener's tauberian theorem marked an epoch in the subject, introducing unexpected connections to Banach algebra methods in Fourier analysis.

Summation of divergent series is also related to extrapolation methods and sequence transformations as numerical techniques. Examples of such techniques are Padé approximants, Levin-type sequence transformations, and order-dependent mappings related to renormalization techniques for large-order perturbation theory in quantum mechanics.

Properties of summation methods
Summation methods usually concentrate on the sequence of partial sums of the series. While this sequence does not converge, we may often find that when we take an average of larger and larger numbers of initial terms of the sequence, the average converges, and we can use this average instead of a limit to evaluate the sum of the series. A summation method can be seen as a function from a set of sequences of partial sums to values. If A is any summation method assigning values to a set of sequences, we may mechanically translate this to a series-summation method AΣ that assigns the same values to the corresponding series. There are certain properties it is desirable for these methods to possess if they are to arrive at values corresponding to limits and sums, respectively.

 Regularity. A summation method is regular if, whenever the sequence s converges to x,  Equivalently, the corresponding series-summation method evaluates 
 Linearity. A is linear if it is a linear functional on the sequences where it is defined, so that   for sequences r, s and a real or complex scalar k. Since the terms  of the series a are linear functionals on the sequence s and vice versa, this is equivalent to AΣ being a linear functional on the terms of the series.
 Stability (also called translativity). If s is a sequence starting from s0 and s′ is the sequence obtained by omitting the first value and subtracting it from the rest, so that , then A(s) is defined if and only if A(s′) is defined, and  Equivalently, whenever  for all n, then  Another way of stating this is that the shift rule must be valid for the series that are summable by this method.

The third condition is less important, and some significant methods, such as Borel summation, do not possess it.

One can also give a weaker alternative to the last condition.  
 Finite re-indexability.  If a and a′ are two series such that there exists a bijection  such that  for all i, and if there exists some  such that  for all i > N, then   (In other words, a′ is the same series as a, with only finitely many terms re-indexed.)  This is a weaker condition than stability, because any summation method that exhibits stability also exhibits finite re-indexability, but the converse is not true.)

A desirable property for two distinct summation methods A and B to share is consistency: A and B are consistent if for every sequence s to which both assign a value,  (Using this language, a summation method A is regular iff it is consistent with the standard sum Σ.)  If two methods are consistent, and one sums more series than the other, the one summing more series is stronger.

There are powerful numerical summation methods that are neither regular nor linear, for instance nonlinear sequence transformations like Levin-type sequence transformations and Padé approximants, as well as the order-dependent mappings of perturbative series based on renormalization techniques.

Taking regularity, linearity and stability as axioms, it is possible to sum many divergent series by elementary algebraic manipulations. This partly explains why many different summation methods give the same answer for certain series.

For instance, whenever  the geometric series

can be evaluated regardless of convergence. More rigorously, any summation method that possesses these properties and which assigns a finite value to the geometric series must assign this value. However, when r is a real number larger than 1, the partial sums increase without bound, and averaging methods assign a limit of infinity.

Classical summation methods

The two classical summation methods for series, ordinary convergence and absolute convergence, define the sum as a limit of certain partial sums. These are included only for completeness; strictly speaking they are not true summation methods for divergent series since, by definition, a series is divergent only if these methods do not work. Most but not all summation methods for divergent series extend these methods to a larger class of sequences.

Absolute convergence

Absolute convergence defines the sum of a sequence (or set) of numbers to be the limit of the net of all partial sums , if it exists. It does not depend on the order of the elements of the sequence, and a classical theorem says that a sequence is absolutely convergent if and only if the sequence of absolute values is convergent in the standard sense.

Sum of a series

Cauchy's classical definition of the sum of a series  defines the sum to be the limit of the sequence of partial sums . This is the default definition of convergence of a sequence.

Nørlund means
Suppose pn is a sequence of positive terms, starting from p0. Suppose also that

If now we transform a sequence s by using p to give weighted means, setting

then the limit of tn as n goes to infinity is an average called the Nørlund mean Np(s).

The Nørlund mean is regular, linear, and stable. Moreover, any two Nørlund means are consistent.

Cesàro summation

The most significant of the Nørlund means are the Cesàro sums. Here, if we define the sequence pk by

then the Cesàro sum Ck is defined by  Cesàro sums are Nørlund means if , and hence are regular, linear, stable, and consistent. C0 is ordinary summation, and C1 is ordinary Cesàro summation. Cesàro sums have the property that if  then Ch is stronger than Ck.

Abelian means
Suppose } is a strictly increasing sequence tending towards infinity, and that . Suppose

converges for all real numbers x > 0. Then the Abelian mean Aλ is defined as

More generally, if the series for f only converges for large x but can be analytically continued to all positive real x, then one can still define the sum of the divergent series by the limit above.

A series of this type is known as a generalized Dirichlet series; in applications to physics, this is known as the method of heat-kernel regularization.

Abelian means are regular and linear, but not stable and not always consistent between different choices of λ. However, some special cases are very important summation methods.

Abel summation

If , then we obtain the method of Abel summation. Here

where z = exp(−x). Then the limit of f(x) as x approaches 0 through positive reals is the limit of the power series for f(z) as z approaches 1 from below through positive reals, and the Abel sum A(s) is defined as

Abel summation is interesting in part because it is consistent with but more powerful than Cesàro summation:  whenever the latter is defined. The Abel sum is therefore regular, linear, stable, and consistent with Cesàro summation.

Lindelöf summation
If , then (indexing from one) we have

Then L(s), the Lindelöf sum , is the limit of f(x) as x goes to positive zero. The Lindelöf sum is a powerful method when applied to power series among other applications, summing power series in the Mittag-Leffler star.

If g(z) is analytic in a disk around zero, and hence has a Maclaurin series G(z) with a positive radius of convergence, then  in the Mittag-Leffler star.  Moreover, convergence to g(z) is uniform on compact subsets of the star.

Analytic continuation

Several summation methods involve taking the value of an analytic continuation of a function.

Analytic continuation of power series

If Σanxn converges for small complex x and can be analytically continued along some path from x = 0 to the point x = 1, then the sum of the series can be defined to be the value at x = 1. This value may depend on the choice of path. One of the first examples of potentially different sums for a divergent series, using analytic continuation, was given by Callet, who observed that if   then

However, the gaps in the series are key. For  for example, we actually would get

, so different sums correspond to different placements of the 's.

Euler summation

Euler summation is essentially an explicit form of analytic continuation. Euler used it before analytic continuation was defined in general, and gave explicit formulas for the power series of the analytic continuation.

The operation of Euler summation can be repeated several times, and this is essentially equivalent to taking an analytic continuation of a power series to the point z = 1.

Analytic continuation of Dirichlet series

This method defines the sum of a series to be the value of the analytic continuation of the Dirichlet series

at s = 0, if this exists and is unique. This method is sometimes confused with zeta function regularization.

If s = 0 is an isolated singularity, the sum is defined by the constant term of the Laurent series expansion.

Zeta function regularization

If the series

(for positive values of the an) converges for large real s and can be analytically continued along the real line to s = −1, then its value at s = −1 is called the zeta regularized sum of the series a1 + a2 + ... Zeta function regularization is nonlinear. In applications, the numbers ai are sometimes the eigenvalues of a self-adjoint operator A with compact resolvent, and f(s) is then the trace of A−s. For example, if A has eigenvalues 1, 2, 3, ...  then f(s) is the Riemann zeta function, ζ(s), whose value at s = −1 is −, assigning a value to the divergent series . Other values of s can also be used to assign values for the divergent sums ,  and in general

where Bk is a Bernoulli number.

Integral function means
If J(x) = Σpnxn is an integral function, then the J sum of the series a0 + ... is defined to be

if this limit exists.

There is a variation of this method where the series for J has a finite radius of convergence r and diverges at x = r. In this case one defines the sum as above, except taking the limit as x tends to r rather than infinity.

Borel summation
In the special case when J(x) = ex this gives one (weak) form of Borel summation.

Valiron's method
Valiron's method is a generalization of Borel summation to certain more general integral functions J. Valiron showed that under certain conditions it is equivalent to defining the sum of a series as 

where H is the second derivative of G and c(n) = e−G(n), and a0 + ... + ah is to be interpreted as 0 when h < 0.

Moment methods

Suppose that dμ is a measure on the  real line such that all the moments

 

are finite. If a0 + a1 + ... is a series such that

converges for all x in the support of μ, then the (dμ) sum of the series is defined to be the value of the integral

 

if it is defined. (If the numbers μn increase too rapidly then they do not uniquely determine the measure μ.)

Borel summation
For example, if dμ = e−x dx for positive x and 0 for negative x then μn = n!, and this gives one version of Borel summation, where the value of a sum is given by 

There is a generalization of this depending on a variable α, called the (B′,α) sum, where the sum of a series a0 + ... is defined to be

 

if this integral exists. A further generalization is to replace the sum under the integral by its analytic continuation from small t.

Miscellaneous methods

BGN hyperreal summation

This summation method works by using an extension to the real numbers known as the hyperreal numbers.  Since the hyperreal numbers include distinct infinite values, these numbers can be used to represent the values of divergent series.  The key method is to designate a particular infinite value that is being summed, usually , which is used as a unit of infinity.  Instead of summing to an arbitrary infinity (as is typically done with ), the BGN method sums to the specific hyperreal infinite value labeled .  Therefore, the summations are of the form

This allows the usage of standard formulas for finite series such as arithmetic progressions in an infinite context.

Hausdorff transformations

.

Hölder summation

Hutton's method

Ingham summability

The series a1 + ... is called Ingham summable to s if

 

Albert Ingham showed that if δ is any positive number then (C,−δ) (Cesàro) summability implies Ingham summability, and Ingham summability implies (C,δ) summability .

Lambert summability

The series a1 + ... is called Lambert summable to s if

If a series is (C,k) (Cesàro) summable for any k then it is Lambert summable to the same value, and if a series is Lambert summable then it is Abel summable to the same value .

Le Roy summation

The series a0 + ... is called Le Roy summable to s if

Mittag-Leffler summation
The series a0 + ... is called Mittag-Leffler (M) summable to s if

Ramanujan summation

Ramanujan summation is a method of assigning a value to divergent series used by Ramanujan and based on the Euler–Maclaurin summation formula. The Ramanujan sum of a series f(0) + f(1) + ... depends not only on the values of f at integers, but also on values of the function f at non-integral points, so it is not really a summation method in the sense of this article.

Riemann summability

The series a1 + ... is called (R,k) (or Riemann) summable to s if

 

The series a1 + ... is called R2 summable to s if

Riesz means

If λn form an increasing sequence of real numbers and

 

then the Riesz (R,λ,κ) sum of the series a0 + ... is defined to be

Vallée-Poussin summability
The series a1 + ... is called VP (or Vallée-Poussin) summable to s if

 
where  is the gamma function.
.

See also
 Silverman–Toeplitz theorem

Notes

References

 .
 .
 .
 .
 .
 .
 .
 
 Werner Balser: "From Divergent Power Series to Analytic Functions", Springer-Verlag, LNM 1582, ISBN 0-387-58268-1 (1994).
 William O. Bray and Časlav V. Stanojević(Eds.): "Analysis of Divergence", Springer, ISBN 978-1-4612-7467-4 (1999).
 Alexander I. Saichev and Wojbor Woyczynski:"Distributions in the Physical and Engineering Sciences, Volume 1", Chap.8 "Summation of divergent series and integrals",Springer (2018).

 
Mathematical series
Summability methods
Asymptotic analysis
Summability theory